is a former sumo wrestler from Kasuga, Fukuoka Prefecture, Japan. He began his professional career in 1993, reaching the top makuuchi division some 15 years later in 2008. His highest rank was maegashira 7. He retired in April 2011 after the Japan Sumo Association found him guilty of involvement in match-fixing.

Career
At elementary school he was a softball player and at junior high school he excelled at baseball. After his graduation he was recruited by Sadogatake stable, and made his professional debut in March 1993. Initially fighting under the shikona of Kotonoyama, he progressed to the sandanme division in 1995, and first reached the makushita division in 1997. He adopted the name of Kotokasuga in 1999, in honour of his hometown. In November 2004 he finally made the elite sekitori ranks when he was promoted to the jūryō division. He was ranked in jūryō for four further tournaments in May, July and September 2005 and January 2006, but then struggled again in makushita. After injuries to both his elbows he considered retiring, but he won promotion back to jūryō in September 2007 at the age of 30, and then four consecutive kachi-koshi or winning records saw him promoted to the top makuuchi division in May 2008. It had taken him 91 tournaments from his professional debut to get there, the second slowest ever at the time. He could only manage a 4–11 record in his top division debut and dropped back to jūryō. However, he made a return to makuuchi in September 2010, and on this occasion came through with a winning score of 9–6. This saw him promoted to his highest rank of maegashira 7 for the November 2010 tournament.

Retirement from sumo
In April 2011, along with 19 other wrestlers and coaches, he was ordered to retire by the Sumo Association after an investigation found he arranged the result of matches. He submitted retirement papers on 4 April. His danpatsu-shiki or retirement ceremony was held at the Ryogoku Kokugikan in June 2011. He now runs a yakiniku restaurant in Fukuoka city.

Fighting style
Kotokasuga was an oshi-sumo specialist who preferred pushing and thrusting to fighting on the mawashi. His most common winning kimarite was oshi-dashi (push out), closely followed by yori-kiri (force out). Together these two techniques accounted for half his career victories.

Personal life
Kotokasuga announced upon his promotion to the top division in May 2008 that he was marrying an old classmate who he became re-acquainted with after the March tournament of 2006 and who he began dating in May of that year. Kotokasuga pointed out that he had not had a make-koshi or losing record since they got together. He had first proposed to her in November 2009, but her father had insisted that Kotokasuga reach makuuchi first.

Career record

See also
Glossary of sumo terms
List of past sumo wrestlers

References

External links
 

1977 births
Living people
Japanese sumo wrestlers
Sumo people from Fukuoka Prefecture
Sadogatake stable sumo wrestlers
Sportspeople banned for life